Sarab-e Alinaqi (also Romanized as Sarāb-e ‘Alīnaqī; also known as ‘Ali Nākhi, ‘Alī Naqī, Sarāb-e Yās, and Sarāb Yās) is a village in Beyranvand-e Jonubi Rural District, Bayravand District, Khorramabad County, Lorestan Province, Iran. At the 2006 census, its population was 118, in 27 families.

References 

Towns and villages in Khorramabad County